The 2015 OEC Taipei WTA Challenger was a professional tennis tournament played on indoor carpet courts. It was the 8th edition of OEC's Taipei Open tournaments, and part of the 2015 WTA 125K series. It took place in Taipei, Taiwan, on 16–22 November 2015.

Singles entrants

Seeds 

 1 Rankings as of 9 November 2015.

Other entrants 
The following players received wildcards into the singles main draw:
  Chan Chin-wei
  Cho I-hsuan
  Hsu Chieh-yu
  Hsu Ching-wen

The following players received entry from the qualifying draw:
  Hiroko Kuwata
  Nicha Lertpitaksinchai
  Tena Lukas
  Kotomi Takahata

Doubles entrants

Seeds 

 1 Rankings as of 9 November 2015.

Other entrants 
The following pairs received wildcards into the doubles main draw:
  Chen Yen-ling /  Juan Ting-fei
  Cho Yi-tsen /  Wu Fang-hsien
  Lee Pei-chi /  Yang Chia-hsien
  Lee Yang /  Shih Hsin-yuan

Champions

Singles 

 Tímea Babos def.  Misaki Doi 7–5, 6–3

Doubles 

 Kanae Hisami /  Kotomi Takahata def.  Marina Melnikova /  Elise Mertens 6–1, 6–2

External links 
 Official website

2015 WTA 125K series
2015
Carpet court tennis tournaments
Tennis tournaments in Taiwan
2015 in Taiwanese tennis
2015 in Taiwanese women's sport